The Second Division Challenge Cup is a football competition that takes place in Gozo.

The cup holders are SK Victoria Wanderers which won the cup after beating Zebbug Rovers in the final.  This competition is contested by the winners of the Second Division and the winners or runners-up of the Second Division Knock-Out. The first Second Division Challenge Cup took place in the season 2006–2007.

Cup Winners 
Here is a complete list of the past champions of the Second Division Challenge Cup
2007-2008 SK Victoria Wanderers
2006-2007 SK Victoria Wanderers

External links 
 Gozo FA

Football cup competitions in Malta
Football competitions in Gozo